Lepiderema pulchella  commonly known as fine-leaved tuckeroo , is a species of flowering plant in the family Sapindaceae and is endemic to coastal eastern Australia. It is a tree with pinnate, glossy light green leaves with four to fourteen leaflets, panicles of yellow-orange flowers and brown, spherical to three-lobed fruit.

Description

Taxonomy
Lepiderema pulchella was first formally described in 1907 by Ludwig Adolph Timotheus Radlkofer in Die Natürlichen Pflanzenfamilien Nachtr.

Distribution and habitat
Fine-leaved tuckeroo grows on creek and river banks and at the edge of rainforest from far south-eastern Queensland to the Tweed River in New South Wales.

Conservation status
This tuckeroo is classified as "vulnerable" under the Queensland Government Nature Conservation Act 1992.

References

Sapindaceae
Flora of New South Wales
Flora of Queensland
Sapindales of Australia
Plants described in 1907
Taxa named by Ludwig Adolph Timotheus Radlkofer